The Convent of the Barefoot Trinitarians (Spanish: Convento de las Monjas Trinitarias Descalzas) is a convent located in Madrid, Spain. It was declared Bien de Interés Cultural in 1943.

Cervantes
Writer Miguel de Cervantes was buried at the convent in 1616. His remains were temporarily transferred elsewhere in 1673 during rebuilding, and were then lost until forensic scientists discovered them in 2015.

References 

Convents in Spain
Buildings and structures in Cortes neighborhood, Madrid
Bien de Interés Cultural landmarks in Madrid
Trinitarian Order